Note — many sporting events did not take place because of World War I or the 1918 flu pandemic

1918 in sports describes the year's events in world sport.

American football
College championship
 College football national championship – Pittsburgh Panthers
Professional football
 Most teams shut down due to World War I and the flu pandemic; those that continue play are forced to delay the start of play until the middle of October or later
 Dayton Triangles defeat Detroit Heralds, both of whom continue full operations despite war and flu, to establish themselves as the strongest team in the US
 Buffalo Niagaras sign Tommy Hughitt for play in a citywide league, establishing a trend of expansion of top-level professional competition outside Ohio

Association football
Europe
 There is no major football in Europe due to World War I

Australian rules football
VFL Premiership
 South Melbourne wins the 22nd VFL Premiership beating Collingwood 9.8 (62) to 7.15 (57) in the 1918 VFL Grand Final.
South Australian Football League:
 not contested due to World War I
West Australian Football League:
 21 September: East Fremantle 11.8 (74) defeat East Perth 8.5 (53) for their tenth WAFL premiership.

Bandy
Sweden
 Championship final – IFK Uppsala 4–1 IK Sirius (replay following 2–2 draw)

Baseball
World Series
 5–11 September — Boston Red Sox (AL) defeats Chicago Cubs (NL) to win the 1918 World Series by 4 games to 2
Events
 Babe Ruth leads the American League in home runs for the first time, hitting 11
 2 September — professional baseball is curtailed to accelerate mobilisation for war

Boxing
Events
 No world titles change hands in 1918 but Jack Dempsey, with a series of knockouts including one against Battling Levinsky, is now the main challenger to Jess Willard.  
Lineal world champions
 World Heavyweight Championship – Jess Willard
 World Light Heavyweight Championship – Battling Levinsky
 World Middleweight Championship – Mike O'Dowd
 World Welterweight Championship – Ted "Kid" Lewis
 World Lightweight Championship – Benny Leonard
 World Featherweight Championship – Johnny Kilbane
 World Bantamweight Championship – Pete Herman
 World Flyweight Championship – Jimmy Wilde

Canadian football
Grey Cup
 not contested due to World War I

Cricket
Events
 There is no first-class cricket in England, Australia, South Africa or the West Indies due to World War I. A number of first-class matches are arranged in New Zealand but are not part of any official competition.
India
 Bombay Quadrangular – Hindus shared with Parsees
New Zealand
 Plunket Shield – not contested

Cycling
Tour de France
 not contested due to World War I
Giro d'Italia
 not contested due to World War I

Figure skating
World Figure Skating Championships
 not contested due to World War I

Golf
Events
 All major championships are cancelled due to World War I

Horse racing
England
 Grand National – not held due to World War I
 1,000 Guineas Stakes – Ferry
 2,000 Guineas Stakes – Gainsborough
 The Derby – Gainsborough
 The Oaks – My Dear
 St. Leger Stakes – Gainsborough
Australia
 Melbourne Cup – Night Watch
Canada
 King's Plate – Springside
Ireland
 Irish Grand National – Ballyboggan
 Irish Derby Stakes – King John 
USA
 Kentucky Derby – Exterminator
 Preakness Stakes – not contested as a single race
 Belmont Stakes – Johren

Ice hockey
Stanley Cup
 The temporary Toronto Arenas team defeats the Montreal Canadiens 10–7 to win the inaugural National Hockey League (NHL) championship  
 Vancouver Millionaires defeats Seattle Metropolitans 3–2 to win the Pacific Coast Hockey Association championship 
 20–30 March — Toronto Arenas (NHL) defeats Vancouver Millionaires (PCHA) in the 1918 Stanley Cup Finals by 3 games to 2
Events
 2 January — Montreal Wanderers disbands following destruction of its home venue by fire
 Allan Cup is won by Kitchener Greenshirts

Motor racing
Events
 No major races are held anywhere worldwide due to World War I

Rowing
The Boat Race
 Oxford and Cambridge Boat Race – not contested due to World War I

Rugby league
England
 All first-class competitions are cancelled due to World War I
Australia
 NSW Premiership – South Sydney (outright winner)
New Zealand
1918 New Zealand rugby league season

Rugby union
Five Nations Championship
 Five Nations Championship series is not contested due to World War I

Speed skating
Speed Skating World Championships
 not contested due to World War I

Tennis
Australia
 Australian Men's Singles Championship – not contested due to World War I
England
 Wimbledon Men's Singles Championship – not contested due to World War I
 Wimbledon Women's Singles Championship – not contested due to World War I
France
 French Men's Singles Championship – not contested due to World War I
 French Women's Singles Championship – not contested due to World War I
USA
 American Men's Singles Championship – Lindley Murray (USA) defeats Bill Tilden (USA) 6–3 6–1 7–5
 American Women's Singles Championship – Molla Bjurstedt Mallory (Norway) defeats Eleanor E. Goss (USA) 6–4 6–3
Davis Cup
 1918 International Lawn Tennis Challenge – not contested

References

 
Sports by year